Emily Jane Schild (born August 19, 1998 in Fort Wayne, Indiana) is an American artistic gymnast. She has been a member of the U.S. National team since 2015 and made her international debut at the 2015 City of Jesolo Trophy. At the 2015 Pan-American Games in Toronto, she was part of the gold-winning US team.

Personal life 
Emily Jane Schild was born on August 19, 1998 in Fort Wayne, Indiana,  parents David and Maria Schild. The family moved to North Carolina when Schild was around 5 years old.

A member of the National Honor Society, Schild was homeschooled through the NCVP and graduated high school in 2017.  Schild is a senior at the University of Georgia and is signed to their gymnastics program.

Gymnastics career 
Schild began her gymnastics career at DeVeau's School of Gymnastics in Fishers, Indiana, and now trains at Everest Gymnastics in Huntersville, North Carolina under Qi Han and Yiwen Chen.

2013–14: Level 10 and Junior International Elite 
Schild qualified to the 2013 Nastia Liukin Cup as a Level 10 athlete and finished nineteenth all-around. Later in the season, she tested for Junior International Elite and qualified for the 2013 U.S. Classic. Later, she advanced to the 2013 P&G U.S. Nationals and was twenty-fifth all-around and eighth on vault.

Schild was nursing an injury during 2014 and was forced to sit out the whole season.

2015–present: Senior International Elite and National Team breakthrough 
Schild was added to the U.S. Senior National team after the 2015 City of Jesolo Trophy selection camp, where she was also selected to the U.S. team. In 2016, Schild was named to the National Team and invited to compete at the 2016 Olympic trials, but was not selected for the Olympic team.

References

External links 
 

1998 births
American female artistic gymnasts
Sportspeople from Fort Wayne, Indiana
University of Georgia people
Living people
Pan American Games gold medalists for the United States
Pan American Games medalists in gymnastics
Gymnasts from Indiana
Georgia Gym Dogs gymnasts
People from Huntersville, North Carolina
U.S. women's national team gymnasts
Gymnasts at the 2015 Pan American Games
Medalists at the 2015 Pan American Games